This is a list of Jacobean union tracts, published or manuscript treatises bearing on the Jacobean debate on the Union.

Scottish authors

English authors

References 

James VI and I
1600s in England
1610s in England
1600s in Scotland
1610s in Scotland
Jacobean union tracts
Jacobean union tracts
Renaissance in Scotland